The Sustainable Dairying: Water Accord is a voluntary agreement signed by leading participants of New Zealand's dairy industry in 2014. It serves as a successor to the 2003 Dairying and Clean Streams Accord.

References

Environment of New Zealand
Agriculture in New Zealand
Dairy farming in New Zealand
Water in New Zealand
2014 in the environment